Gregory John Rowell (born 1 September 1966 in Lindfield, New South Wales) is an Australian cricket player, who has played for the Queensland Bulls, New South Wales Blues, and Tasmanian Tigers. He was a right-handed batsman and useful right arm fast bowler.

On 11 May 2007, Rowell announced his intention to stand as the Labor candidate for Lord Mayor in the 2008 Brisbane City Council election . He secured 29% of the primary vote and lost to incumbent Campbell Newman.

Since then, Rowell has campaigned strongly on the issues of securing water for Brisbane's future and the need to provide better public transport. Brisbane is currently experiencing Level Six water restrictions, and users of its bus system experience chronic overcrowding.

See also
 List of Tasmanian representative cricketers
 List of New South Wales representative cricketers

References

External links
Cricinfo Profile
Brisbane Mayoral Campaign Website

1966 births
Living people
Australian cricketers
Tasmania cricketers
Queensland cricketers
New South Wales cricketers
Queensland local government politicians
Cricketers from Sydney